Bima Stagg is an American writer and filmmaker living in Los Angeles, California.

Filmography

Writer
 Soul Patrol (1978)  Death of a Snowman (UK original title), Black Trash (USA video title)
 Survivor (1987)
 Inside (1996)
 Stander (2003)

Actor
 Soul Patrol (1978) .... Johnson
 Survivor (1987) .... Second Bedouin

Warhol Films
Appearances in Andy Warhol's Screen Tests, a series of silent film portraits:
 Beauty No. 1 (1965) .... Himself
 Screen Test #1 (1965) .... Himself
 Screen Test #2 (1965) .... Himself
 Screen Test #3 (1966) .... Himself ... a.k.a. Suicide (USA alternative title)
 Screen Test #4 (1966) .... Himself

External links
 

Writers from California
Year of birth missing (living people)
Living people
American male writers